Innocent Nkasiobi Emeghara (born 27 May 1989) is a Swiss professional footballer who plays as a striker.

Club career
Born in Lagos, Nigeria, Emeghara moved to Switzerland at the age of 13 (two years after his mother), and started playing football as a means to "cope with the language barrier and cold temperatures". He began his senior career with FC Zürich's reserves aged only 17, going on to represent FC Winterthur and Grasshopper Club Zürich; on 20 August 2011, whilst at the service of the latter, he scored a hat-trick in a 4–3 away win against Servette FC, which meant he led the Super League's scoring charts at five in only six games.

On 31 August 2011, Emeghara was sold to FC Lorient in France. He made his debut in Ligue 1 on 10 September, coming on as a substitute for Mathias Autret in a 1–1 draw at FC Sochaux-Montbéliard and netting the equalizer two minutes from time. He scored four more league goals until the end of his first season, adding two in the Coupe de la Ligue.

In January 2013, Emeghara moved teams and countries again, joining Italian side A.C. Siena. He scored four goals in as many matches to kickstart his Serie A career, including a brace in a 3–0 home success over S.S. Lazio on 18 February; his team, however, finally suffered relegation after ranking second from bottom.

For the 2013–2014 campaign, Emeghara continued in Italy's top flight, being loaned to A.S. Livorno Calcio. On 31 March 2014, he contributed with one goal to help the hosts come from behind to tie it 2–2 with Inter Milan.

In July 2014, Emeghara became a free agent after Siena went into liquidation. On 11 October he signed a three-year contract with Azerbaijan Premier League side FK Qarabağ, but left on 5 January of the following year and began training with Winterthur, before going on trial with HSV Hamburg the following week.

Late into January 2015, Emeghara joined the San Jose Earthquakes. He made his debut in the Major League Soccer on 8 March, playing one minute in a 0–1 away loss against FC Dallas.

On 24 July 2018, Emeghara returned to Qarabağ on a two-year deal from Ermis Aradippou FC, but was released early from his contract by mutual consent on 13 May 2019.

In October 2020, after he trained already three weeks with the club, Emeghara signed a two-year contract at his home-based club FC Winterthur, where he launched his career back in 2010. His contract with Winterthur was terminated by the club in July 2021.

International career
Emeghara opted to represent Switzerland internationally, and he made his debut on 4 June 2011 by playing one minute in a 2–2 draw in England for the UEFA Euro 2012 qualifiers.

In that same year, he helped the under-21 team finish second at the 2011 UEFA European Championship, scoring in the 2–0 group stage win against Iceland. He represented the country at the 2012 Summer Olympics, netting in the 1–2 group phase defeat by South Korea.

Career statistics

Club

International

References

External links

1989 births
Living people
Swiss people of Nigerian descent
Nigerian emigrants to Switzerland
Sportspeople from Lagos
Swiss men's footballers
Association football forwards
Swiss Super League players
Swiss Challenge League players
FC Zürich players
FC Winterthur players
Grasshopper Club Zürich players
FC Lorient players
A.C.N. Siena 1904 players
U.S. Livorno 1915 players
Qarabağ FK players
San Jose Earthquakes players
Ermis Aradippou FC players
Fatih Karagümrük S.K. footballers
Ligue 1 players
Serie A players
Azerbaijan Premier League players
Major League Soccer players
Designated Players (MLS)
Cypriot First Division players
Süper Lig players
Switzerland under-21 international footballers
Switzerland international footballers
Footballers at the 2012 Summer Olympics
Olympic footballers of Switzerland
Swiss expatriate footballers
Expatriate footballers in France
Expatriate footballers in Italy
Expatriate footballers in Azerbaijan
Expatriate soccer players in the United States
Expatriate footballers in Cyprus
Expatriate footballers in Turkey
Swiss expatriate sportspeople in France
Swiss expatriate sportspeople in Italy
Swiss expatriate sportspeople in Azerbaijan
Swiss expatriate sportspeople in the United States
Swiss expatriate sportspeople in Cyprus
Swiss expatriate sportspeople in Turkey